Lynn B. Clough (May 12, 1850 – September 6, 1926) was an American politician in the state of Washington. He served in the Washington State Senate from 1889 to 1893.

References

1850 births
1926 deaths
Republican Party Washington (state) state senators
Mayors of Vancouver, Washington